Konstantin Vassiljev (born 16 August 1984) is an Estonian professional footballer who plays as an attacking midfielder for Meistriliiga club Flora and captains the Estonia national team.

Vassiljev has been named Estonian Footballer of the Year three times, and has won the Estonian Silverball award a record six times.

Club career

TJK
Vassiljev began playing football at TJK youth academy. He made his senior league debut in the III liiga with TJK-83 Tallinn.

Levadia
In January 2003, Vassiljev signed for Meistriliiga club Levadia. He made his debut in the Meistriliiga on 15 March 2003, playing for Levadia's Tallinn-based team against the Maardu-based Levadia team in a 1–0 loss. Vassiljev scored his first Meistriliiga goal on 13 May 2003, in a 9–3 away victory over Kuressaare. After the 2003 season, the Maardu team moved to Tallinn, while the Tallinn team became their new reserve team in the Esiliiga. He won his first Meistriliiga title in the 2004 season. Vassiljev captained Levadia during the 2006 season. He won two more Meistriliiga titles, in 2006 and 2007.

Nafta Lendava
In February 2008, Vassiljev signed for Slovenian PrvaLiga club Nafta Lendava. He made his debut in the PrvaLiga on 2 March 2008, in a 2–0 away loss to Celje. Vassiljev scored his first goal for Nafta Lendava on 16 March 2008, in a 2–1 away defeat to Drava Ptuj.

Koper
On 31 January 2011, Vassiljev signed a two-and-a-half-year contract with PrvaLiga champions Koper. He scored his first goal for Koper on 2 April 2011 in a 3–0 home victory over Maribor.

Amkar Perm
On 29 August 2011, Vassiljev signed a three-year contract with Russian Premier League club Amkar Perm for a fee reported to be around €1 million. He made his debut in the Russian Premier League on 11 September 2011, against Spartak Moscow, but had to be substituted after 44 minutes due to injury. The match ended in a 1–0 loss. Vassiljev scored his first goal for Amkar Perm on 20 August 2012, from a penalty in a 2–0 win over Krylia Sovetov Samara.

Piast Gliwice
On 26 August 2014, Vassiljev signed a one-year contract with Ekstraklasa club Piast Gliwice. He made his debut three days later, against Zawisza Bydgoszcz, coming on as a half-time substitute for Carles Martínez, but had to be substituted himself after sustaining a knee injury in the 3–0 home win. Vassiljev scored his first goal for Piast Gliwice on 29 October 2014, in a 5–0 home victory over GKS Bełchatów in a Polish Cup match. On 3 November 2014, he scored his first Ekstraklasa goal, in a 4–2 victory over Podbeskidzie Bielsko-Biała.

Jagiellonia Białystok
On 18 June 2015, Vassiljev signed a two-year contract with Ekstraklasa club Jagiellonia Białystok. He made his first appearance for the club on 2 July 2015, starting in the 1–0 first leg victory of their UEFA Europa League qualification round against Kruoja Pakruojis. Vassiljev scored 13 goals in the 2016–17 season, and was also the league's top assist provider with 13, while Jagiellonia Białystok finished the season as runners up.

Return to Piast Gliwice
On 3 July 2017, Vassiljev signed a three-year contract with his former club Piast Gliwice.

Flora
On 27 February 2019, Vassiljev returned to Estonia after 11 years abroad, signing a one-year contract with Flora. He made his debut for the club on 10 March 2019 in a 2–0 win over Tulevik. Flora won the 2019 Meistriliiga with Vassiljev scoring 12 goals. 

At the end of the season Vassiljev signed another one-year contract. Flora won all three Estonian cups in the season – 2020 Meistriliiga, 2019–20 Estonian Cup and 2020 Estonian Supercup. They also reached the 2020–21 UEFA Europa League play-off round. At the end of the season he extended the contract for a third season with the club.

International career

Vassiljev began his youth career in 2002 with the Estonia under-19 team. He has also represented the under-21 national side.

Vassiljev made his senior international debut for Estonia on 31 May 2006, in a 1–1 home draw against New Zealand in a friendly. He scored his first international goal for Estonia on 28 March 2009, in a 2–2 away draw against Armenia in a qualification match for the 2010 FIFA World Cup. Vassiljev soon developed into a prolific goalscorer for the national team, capable of finishing well from distance with an accurate and powerful shot. He made his 100th appearance for Estonia on 24 March 2018, in a 0–0 away draw against Armenia in a friendly. Vassiljev has been named Estonian Footballer of the Year three times, in 2010, 2011 and 2013, and has won the Estonian Silverball award a record six times, in 2009, 2011, 2012, 2013, 2016, and 2019.

Career statistics

Club

International

Scores and results list Estonia's goal tally first, score column indicates score after each Vassiljev goal.

Honours
Levadia
Meistriliiga: 2004, 2006, 2007
Estonian Cup: 2003–04, 2004–05, 2006–07

Flora
Meistriliiga: 2019, 2020
Estonian Cup: 2019–20
Estonian Supercup: 2020, 2021

Individual
Estonian Footballer of the Year: 2010, 2011, 2013
Estonian Silverball: 2009, 2011, 2012, 2013, 2016, 2019
 Order of the White Star, 4th Class

See also
 List of men's footballers with 100 or more international caps

References

External links

1984 births
Living people
Footballers from Tallinn
Estonian footballers
Estonian people of Russian descent
Association football midfielders
Tallinna JK players
FCI Levadia Tallinn players
FCI Levadia U21 players
NK Nafta Lendava players
FC Koper players
FC Amkar Perm players
Piast Gliwice players
Jagiellonia Białystok players
FC Flora players
Esiliiga players
Meistriliiga players
Slovenian PrvaLiga players
Russian Premier League players
Ekstraklasa players
Estonian expatriate footballers
Estonian expatriate sportspeople in Slovenia
Expatriate footballers in Slovenia
Estonian expatriate sportspeople in Russia
Expatriate footballers in Russia
Estonian expatriate sportspeople in Poland
Expatriate footballers in Poland
Estonia youth international footballers
Estonia under-21 international footballers
Estonia international footballers
FIFA Century Club
Recipients of the Order of the White Star, 4th Class